Praveen Chithravel is an Indian athlete who competes in triple jump.

References

External links 
 

2001 births
Living people
Athletes from Tamil Nadu
Indian male triple jumpers
Athletes (track and field) at the 2022 Commonwealth Games
Commonwealth Games competitors for India
Athletes (track and field) at the 2018 Summer Youth Olympics